Hilarinus (or Hilary; died 361 AD) was a martyr who died with Donatus of Arezzo during the persecutions of the Roman Emperor Julian (r. 361–363). 
His feast day is 16 July.

Monks of Ramsgate account

The monks of St Augustine's Abbey, Ramsgate wrote in their Book of Saints (1921),

Roman Martyrology
The Roman Martyrology mentions Hilarinus in the lives of Saints Donatus and Gallicanus,

Butler's account

The hagiographer Alban Butler (1710–1773) wrote in his Lives of the Fathers, Martyrs, and Other Principal Saints under August 7,

Notes

Sources

Further reading

Saints from Roman Italy
361 deaths